Dinglewood may refer to:

Dinglewood, Columbus, Georgia, a neighborhood in Columbus, Georgia
Dinglewood House (Columbus, Georgia), a house at 1429 Dinglewood Avenue, listed on the NRHP in Georgia
Dinglewood Historic District, Columbus, Georgia, listed on the NRHP in Georgia